The Lobster loos are iconic public toilets in Wellington, the capital city of New Zealand. They are part of the Kumutoto public space, on Queen's Wharf along the Wellington Waterfront. They are formed from two concrete 'tentacles' covered over by a red-orange steel shroud. The toilets have been the subject of international interest.

The toilets are open 24 hours.

See also
The Bucket Fountain

External links
Lobster loos – The Architecture Centre

References

Buildings and structures in Wellington City